Tamin (also Romanized as Tamīn and Temīn; also known as Tamīn-e Pā’īn) is a village in Tamin Rural District, in the Central District of Mirjaveh County, Sistan and Baluchestan Province, Iran. At the 2006 census, its population was 457, in 81 families.

References 

Populated places in Mirjaveh County